Nigar Sultana (21 June 1932 – 21 April 2000) was an Indian actress who worked in Hindi films. She appeared in Aag (1948), Patanga (1949), Sheesh Mahal (1950), Mirza Ghalib (1954), Yahudi (1958), Do Kaliyaan (1968), etc. but she is most notably remembered for playing the role of "Bahar begum" in the historical epic film Mughal-e-Azam (1960). She was the wife of filmmaker K. Asif. She died in May 2000, in Mumbai, India.

Early life and education
Nigar Sultana was born on 21 June 1932 in Hyderabad, India. She was the youngest daughter of a family of five. She has two brothers and two sisters. She spent her childhood in Hyderabad where her father held the rank of a Major in the Nizam’s State Army.

She went to school for a while and later studied at home. She took part in a school drama on one occasion and ever after was keen on acting.

Career
The first film Nigar ever saw was Hum Tum Aur Woh (1938). She was so utterly thrilled by it that when Jagdish Sethi, a friend of her father’s, offered her the lead in a film he was making with Mohan Bhavnani, she took it on the spot.

She entered the films with the 1946 film Rangbhoomi. Raj Kapoor's Aag (1948) was her first big break to Hindi films. She played the character role of "Nirmala", which was equally appreciated by critics and audience. After that, she played character roles in a number of films.

Her first big picture was Shikayat (1948), made in Poona; then came Bela (1947), a Ranjit production, and after that many more in which she played leading roles. She played the role of the court dancer Bahar, who envies Prince Salim's (Dilip Kumar) love for Anarkali (Madhubala) in the film Mughal-e-Azam (1960). The songs Teri mehfil mein and jab raat ho aisi matwali were picturised on her. Her other films included Dara (1953) and Khyber.

Patanga (1949), Dil Ki Basti (1949), Sheesh Mahal (1950), Khel (1950), Daman (1951), Anand Bhavan (1953), Mirza Ghalib (1954), Tankhah (1956), Durgesh Nandini (1956) and Yahudi (1958) are among her noted movies. She was most active during the 1950s and appeared in only a lesser number of movies later. Jumbish: A Movement - The Movie in 1986 was her last Hindi film.

Personal life

Nigar Sultana was linked with Pakistani actor Darpan Kumar. On 13 June 1959, Nigar Sultana held a press conference specifically to deny reports that she had married the Pakistani actor.

Later, Nigar Sultana married K. Asif, producer-director of Mughal-e-Azam (1960). 

Nigar Sultana was the mother of actress Heena Kausar whom she had with filmmaker K.Asif. Heena Kausar appeared in secondary roles in a large number of films during the 1970s and early 1980s.

Two actresses of the 1950s, Chitra (born Afsar-un-nisa) and Paras (born Yusuf-un-nisa) are Nigar Sultana's nieces.

Death
She died on 21 April 2000 in Mumbai, India.

Filmography

 Rangbhoomi (1946)
 1857 (1946)
 Bela (1947)
 Shikayat (1948)
 Nao (1948)
 Mitti Ke Khiloune (1948)
 Aag aka Fire (1948)
 Patanga (1949)
 Sunehre Din (1949)
 Bazaar (1949)
 Balam (1949)
 Sheesh Mahal (1950)
 Khel (1950)
 Khamosh Sipahi (1950)
 Phoolan Ke Haar (1951)
 Daman (1951)
 Hyderabad Ki Nazneen (1952)
 Anand Bhawan (1953)
 Rishta (1954)
 Mirza Ghalib (1954)
 Mastana (1954)
 Mangu (1954)
 Khaibar (1954)
 Sardar (1955)
 Umer Marvi (1956)
 Durgesh Nandini (1956)
 Yahudi (1958)
 Commander (1959)
 Mughal-E-Azam (1960)
 Raaz ki Baat (1962)
 Taj Mahal
 Mere Hamdam Mere Dost (1968)
 Do Kaliyaan (1968)
 Bansi Birju (1972)
 Jumbish: A Movement-The Movie (1986)

References

External links

1932 births
2000 deaths
Sultana, Nigar
Indian film actresses
Actresses in Hindi cinema
20th-century Indian actresses
Actresses in Urdu cinema